Diego de Lima Barcelos (born 5 April 1985) is a Brazilian footballer who plays as an attacking midfielder. He has a twin brother named Diogo.

Club career
Diego Barcelos made his Liga Sagres debut for C.D. Nacional on January 30, 2010,in a 0–4 loss to F.C. Porto. He scored his first goal for the club on his fourth appearance, in a 2–0 home win against U.D. Leiria on 18 April. In 2014, he signed for AEL Limassol in the Cypriot First Division.

Honours
Rio Grande do Sul State League: 2000, 2003, 2004, 2005
Pernambuco State League: 2007

See also
Diogo de Lima Barcelos

References

External links

fpf

1985 births
Footballers from Porto Alegre
Living people
Brazilian footballers
Association football forwards
Brazil under-20 international footballers
Brazilian expatriate footballers
Sport Club Internacional players
Santos FC players
Figueirense FC players
Sport Club do Recife players
Guangzhou F.C. players
C.D. Nacional players
Primeira Liga players
Cypriot First Division players
Chinese Super League players
Varzim S.C. players
Liga Portugal 2 players
Expatriate footballers in China
Brazilian expatriate sportspeople in China
Brazilian expatriate sportspeople in Portugal
Expatriate footballers in Portugal
Expatriate footballers in Cyprus
Expatriate footballers in Thailand
Brazilian twins
Twin sportspeople